This is a list of 71 genera in the subfamily Orthotylinae.

Orthotylinae genera

 Acaciacoris Schaffner, 1977
 Anapus Stål, 1858
 Aoplonema Knight, 1928
 Aoplonemella 
 Apachemiris Carvalho and Schaffner, 1974
 Argyrocoris Van Duzee, 1912
 Ballella Knight, 1959
 Blepharidopterus Kolenati, 1845
 Brachynotocoris Reuter, 1880
 Brooksetta Kelton, 1979
 Ceratocapsus Reuter, 1876
 Ceratopidea Knight, 1968
 Coridromius Signoret, 1862
 Cyrtorhinus Fieber, 1858
 Daleapidea Knight, 1968
 Diaphnidia Uhler, 1895
 Dichaetocoris Knight, 1968
 Ephedrodoma Polhemus & Polhemus, 1984
 Fieberocapsus Carvalho and Southwood, 1955
 Hadronema Uhler, 1872
 Halticus Hahn, 1832  (fleahoppers)
 Heterocordylus Fieber, 1858
 Heterotoma Lepeletier & Serville, 1825
 Hyalochloria Reuter, 1907
 Ilnacora Reuter, 1876
 Ilnacorella Knight, 1925
 Jobertus Distant, 1893
 Kalania Kirkaldy, 1904
 Kamehameha Kirkaldy, 1902
 Koanoa Kirkaldy, 1902
 Labopella Knight, 1929
 Labopidea Uhler, 1877
 Labops Burmeister, 1835
 Lindbergocapsus Wagner, 1960
 Lopidea Uhler, 1872
 Lopidella Knight, 1925
 Loulucoris Asquith, 1995
 Malacocoris Fieber, 1858
 Mecomma Fieber, 1858
 Melanotrichus Reuter, 1875
 Melymacra Schwartz, 2004
 Microtechnites 
 Myrmecophyes Fieber, 1870
 Nesidiorchestes Kirkaldy, 1902
 Nesiomiris Kirkaldy, 1902
 Noctuocoris Knight, 1923
 Oaxacacoris Schwartz and Stonedahl, 1987
 Origonema 
 Orthocephalus Fieber, 1858
 Orthotylus Fieber, 1858
 Pamillia Uhler, 1887
 Paraproba Distant, 1884
 Parthenicus Reuter, 1876
 Pilophoropsidea Henry
 Pilophoropsis Poppius, 1914
 Proboscidotylus Henry, 1995
 Pseudoclerada Kirkaldy, 1902
 Pseudoloxops Kirkaldy, 1905
 Pseudopsallus Van Duzee, 1916
 Pseudoxenetus Reuter, 1909
 Renodaeus Distant, 1893
 Reuteria Puton, 1875
 Saileria Hsiao, 1945
 Sarona Kirkaldy, 1902
 Scalponotatus Kelton, 1969
 Schaffneria Knight, 1966
 Sericophanes Reuter, 1876
 Slaterocoris Wagner, 1956
 Squamocoris Knight, 1968
 Sulamita Kirkaldy, 1902
 Texocoris Schaffner, 1974

References